Jobwin Jhonatan Rosario Muñoz, nicknamed  Bimbo (born 10 May 1984), is a Dominican Republic international football
midfielder who plays for Moca FC in the Dominican Republic First Division

References

External links

Dominican Republic footballers
Dominican Republic international footballers
Association football midfielders
1984 births
Living people
People from Espaillat Province